Seongju Oh (오성주, born 10 December 1964 in Busan) is a South Korean tenor, composer, conductor and poet. He lives in Berlin and has been a permanent member of the Berlin Radio Choir since 1998.

Training and career 
Oh grew up in South Korea. Numerous concert tours to the United States, Canada and within Europe (France, Switzerland, Italy and the Czech Republic) followed. Oh has been a member of the Rundfunkchor Berlin since 1998. He founded the Cantus Grunewald Choir in 2010 and the Musikakademie Berlin in 2012.

Compositional work 
His compositions are premiered by his choirs, members of the Rundfunkchor Berlin and numerous instrumentalists.

Selected works 
 Bergschatten (1997)
 Gloria Paradadisi Cantata for solo voices, 3 choirs and organ (2004)
 Obdachlosen-Kantate for solo voices, viola, flute, accordion, piano and mixed choir  (2006)
 Weihnachtskantate for soprano, mixed choir and pipe organ (2015)
 Kantate zum Erntedankfest for tenor, mixed choir and organ (2016)
 Passionskantate for baritone, mixed choir and organ (2017)
 Osterkantate for baritone, mixed choir and organ (2018)

Discography 
 Antonín Dvořák: Mass in D major with the Südbadischer Kammerchor and the Kammerchor Achern
 Wolfgang Amadeus Mozart: Requiem with the Rundfunkchor Berlin

External links 
 
 Oh on Discogs
 Seongju Oh on the site of the Rundfunkchors Berlin
 Meine Rose - Seongju Oh, tenor /Jeongwoon Sim, Kpiano (YouTube

1964 births
Living people
People from Busan
South Korean tenors
South Korean conductors (music)
South Korean composers
21st-century conductors (music)
21st-century South Korean male singers